This page provides summaries to the 2005 COSAFA Cup.

Format
In the first round, twelve teams were divided into three groups of four teams each. Each group played a knockout tournament. The winners of each group joined Angola (holders) into the final round.

First round

Group A
Played in Stade George V, Curepipe, Mauritius.

Semi-finals

Final

Group B
Played in Independence Stadium, Windhoek, Namibia

Semi-finals

Final

Group C
Played in Independence Stadium, Lusaka, Zambia

Semi-finals

Final

Final round
Played in Mmabatho Stadium, Mafikeng, South Africa
Angola (holders) received a bye to the semi-finals.

Semi-finals

Final

Top scorers
4 goals
 Collins Mbesuma

3 goals
 Katlego Mphela
 Sageby Sandaka

2 goals
 Cephas Chimedza
 Francis Chandida

External links
 Details at RSSSF archives

COSAFA Cup
COSAFA Cup